Madroño may refer to:

Places
El Madroño, Spanish municipality of Seville
Navas del Madroño, Spanish municipality of Cáceres, Extremadura

Botany
Garcinia madruno, a tropical species of fruit tree in the family Clusiaceae
Madroño, common name of some North American tree species in the genus Arbutus, family Ericaceae
Madroño (journal), scientific journal of the California Botanical Society